The Cat Vanishes is a 2011 Argentine drama film written and directed by Carlos Sorín.

A college professor (Luque) returns home life after being hospitalized following a nervous breakdown - but his joy is clouded by unforeseen problems with his otherwise loving wife (Spelzini), and his once sweet but now ornery and elusive cat Donatello.

Cast
 Luis Luque as Prof. Luis Romero
 Beatriz Spelzini as Beatriz Romero
 María Abadi as Verónica Romero
 Norma Argentina as Ángela, the housekeeper

References

External links
 

2011 films
2011 drama films
Argentine drama films
2010s Spanish-language films
Films directed by Carlos Sorín
2010s Argentine films